Sanuki udon has been the type of udon noodle most popular in the Kagawa prefecture in Japan, but is now easily found throughout the neighboring Kansai region and much of Japan. It is characterized by its square shape and flat edges with rather chewy texture, and in an authentic sense, ingredients should be from among those local specialties as wheat flour, Niboshi dried young sardines to cook broth for soup and dipping sauce. Many udon shops now specialize solely in sanuki-style chewy udon, and are usually identified by the text "sanuki" in hiragana appearing in the name of the shop or on the sign.

It is usually served as noodle soup or kamaage (udon) in which the noodles are served in plain hot water and eaten with dipping sauce. Originally popularized in the Kagawa Prefecture of Japan, nowadays various types of dashi is applied to the broth outside of Kagawa which varies in strength and flavor across Japan, such as made with more costly Katsuobushi.

Sanuki udon are named after the previous name of the Kagawa Prefecture, Sanuki Province. It has been featured in the 2016 anime, Poco's Udon World.

References

Small-Town Noodles Makes Good, Web Japan. 16 January 2004.  Accessed 24 August 2011.
Takamatsu Travel: Sanuki Udon, Japan-Guide.com, 14 October 2008.  Accessed 24 August 2011.

Japanese noodles
Udon